Augustus A. Smith House, also known as Germain House, is a historic home located at Attica in Wyoming County, New York. It is a large, irregularly massed Queen Anne style residence constructed in 1890.  It features a large two story, semi-circular window bay on the south facade and other fine architectural details in keeping with its style.

It was listed on the National Register of Historic Places in 2007.

References

Houses on the National Register of Historic Places in New York (state)
Queen Anne architecture in New York (state)
Houses completed in 1890
Houses in Wyoming County, New York
National Register of Historic Places in Wyoming County, New York